1108 Demeter, provisional designation , is a dark asteroid from the inner regions of the asteroid belt, approximately  in diameter. It was discovered on 31 May 1929, by German astronomer Karl Reinmuth at the Heidelberg-Königstuhl State Observatory near Heidelberg, Germany. The asteroid was named after Demeter, the Greek goddess of fruitful soil and agriculture. It has a rotation period of 9.846 hours.

Orbit and classification 

Demeter is a non-family asteroid of the main belt's background population when applying the hierarchical clustering method to its proper orbital elements. Based on osculating Keplerian orbital elements, it has also been classified as a member of the Phocaea family, a large family of stony asteroids, different to Demeter spectral type (see below).

It orbits the Sun in the inner main-belt at a distance of 1.8–3.1 AU once every 3 years and 9 months (1,381 days; semi-major axis of 2.43 AU). Its orbit has an eccentricity of 0.26 and an inclination of 25° with respect to the ecliptic. The asteroid was first observed at the Italian Observatory of Turin, three days prior to its official discovery observation at Heidelberg. The body's observation arc begins at Yerkes Observatory in December 1930.

Physical characteristics 

In the Tholen classification, Demeter spectral type is ambiguous, closest to a carbonaceous C-type and somewhat similar to an X-type asteroid.

Rotation period 

In June 2016, a rotational lightcurve of Demeter was obtained from photometric observations by American astronomers Tom Polakis and Brian Skiff at the Command Module Observatory  in Tempe, Arizona. Lightcurve analysis gave a rotation period of 9.846 hours with an amplitude of 0.12 magnitude. Observations by the Spanish OBAS group, also taken during the 2016-opposition, gave a concurring period of 9.870 hours and a brightness variation of 0.11 magnitude. The results supersede previous observations by Robert Stephens, Olivier Thizy, René Roy and Stéphane Charbonnel from July 2001, which gave a period of 9.70 and 9.701 hours with an amplitude of 0.12 and 0.14 magnitude, respectively.

Diameter and albedo 

According to the surveys carried out by the Infrared Astronomical Satellite IRAS, the Japanese Akari satellite and the NEOWISE mission of NASA's Wide-field Infrared Survey Explorer, Demeter measures between 25.285 and 31.33 kilometers in diameter and its surface has a low albedo between 0.0229 and 0.05.

The Collaborative Asteroid Lightcurve Link adopts the results obtained by IRAS, that is, an albedo of 0.0464 and a diameter of 25.61 kilometers based on an absolute magnitude of 11.91.

Naming 

This minor planet was named from Greek mythology after Demeter, the goddess of fruitful soil and agriculture. The official naming citation was mentioned in The Names of the Minor Planets by Paul Herget in 1955.

Conflict with Ceres 

Demeter is the Greek equivalent of the Roman goddess Ceres. When main-belt asteroid and dwarf planet 1 Ceres was named, the Greeks called it "Demeter" effectively translating the name into Greek, rather than using the Latin Ceres or the original Italian Cerere. However, this created a problem when asteroid Demeter was named. The Greeks resolved this by using the classical form of the name, Δημήτηρ Dēmêtēr, for the new asteroid, distinguishing it from the Modern Greek form Δήμητρα Dêmētra that had been used for 1 Ceres. This conflict did not occur in Greek-influenced Slavic languages such as Russian, which had adopted Cerera for 1 Ceres, and were thus free to use the modern Greek form Demetra for the asteroid Demeter.

References

External links 
 Asteroid Lightcurve Database (LCDB), query form (info )
 Dictionary of Minor Planet Names, Google books
 Asteroids and comets rotation curves, CdR – Observatoire de Genève, Raoul Behrend
 Discovery Circumstances: Numbered Minor Planets (1)-(5000) – Minor Planet Center
 
 

001108
Discoveries by Karl Wilhelm Reinmuth
Named minor planets
001108
19290531
Demeter